Kellerberg (Forchheim) is a mountain of Bavaria, Germany.

Mountains of Bavaria
Forchheim